Arie Band is South Korean all-female idol rock band formed around its lead vocalist, Arie. Arie Band was selected as rookie of the month in July 2010. Arie with her band were featured in January 2011 on m.net show M Rookies performing main theme of South Korean television drama Assorted Gems.

Discography

Singles 
 Oh! You, October 2012
 Oh! You (Take 3), April 2013

EPs 
 Astonish The World, November 2012
 OST Best Collection, May 2014

Soundtracks 
 A Hundred Year's Inheritance OST, May 2013
 KBS2 드라마 쌈, 마이웨이, May 2017
 보그맘, September 2017

References 

South Korean rock music groups
All-female bands